Surfers Paradise is an electoral district of the Legislative Assembly in the Australian state of Queensland.  Located in the central portion of the Gold Coast, it is named for Surfers Paradise, the largest suburb of the Gold Coast.

While the Gold Coast has historically tilted conservative, Surfers Paradise has historically been a particularly conservative seat even by Gold Coast standards.  It is one of the few areas of the Gold Coast where Labor has never been competitive at the state level.  It was originally a National seat for all but one term from its creation in 1972 to 2001, with its best-known member being Rob Borbidge, the last National Premier of Queensland.

This tradition was broken after Borbidge resigned in the wake of the Coalition's massive defeat in the 2001 state election.  Due to voter anger at having to go back to the polls for the second time in three months, the Nationals' primary vote plummeted to eight percent, allowing the former mayor of the Gold Coast, Lex Bell, to win as an independent. The seat reverted to form at the 2004 state election, in which Bell was defeated by Liberal John-Paul Langbroek on a large swing.

Since then, the seat has been one of the safest seats in Queensland for the Liberals and the merged Liberal National Party of Queensland, and has often been the safest LNP seat in the state. It is presently the LNP's fifth-safest seat, with Labor needing a 16.6 percent swing to win it. As a measure of how conservative this seat is, Langbroek suffered a swing of 10 percent in 2015, but still retained it with a comfortable majority of 19.2 percent. Langbroek briefly served as opposition leader from 2011 to 2012—the first member from the Liberal side of the merger to hold the post.

The seat is almost entirely within the equally conservative federal seat of Moncrieff.

Members for Surfers Paradise

Election results

References

External links
 

Surfers Paradise